Peravoor is a small town and Grama Panchayat in Kannur district of Kerala state in India. Peravoor is situated in the Western Ghats mountain range.

Introduction
History of Peravoor is related to Pazhassi Raja, a warrior prince and de facto head of the kingdom of Kottayam and one of the earliest freedom fighters of India. There are many remnants of Pazhassi Raja's hiding places in and around of Peravoor.

St. Joseph's Forane Church in Peravoor is the first Syro-Malabar Catholic Church in Malabar, formed under the Thalassery Archdiocese Peravoor is near the Kottiyoor Shiva temple and Sree Mridanga Saileswari Kshethram.

It is the first place where the Syro-Malabar Christian (Nazrani / Saint Thomas Christians) migrants from Northern Travancore region occupied during the Malabar migration. This community contributed to the fields of education, sports, culture and many more basic developments of Peravoor and its vicinity.

Peravoor holds the Guinness World Record for the Tallest Christmas Star in the World.

Government and private institutions include hospitals, schools, clubs, churches, a police station, a fire station, theatres, banks, a treasury, and shopping malls.

Notable people from Peravoor
 Jimmy George (born 8 March 1955 at Peravoor, died 30 November at Italy, 1987) was a professional volleyball player from Peravoor. He is considered as the legend of volleyball. He was the first Indian volleyball player to become a professional, and played in Italy and Abu Dhabi.

Demographics
As of 2011 census, Peravoor Grama Panchayat had total population of 23,558 which constitutes 11,319 males and 12,239 females. There are 5,584 families residing in rural panchayat limits. The sex ratio of Peravoor was 1081 lower than state average of 1084. Population of children in the age group 0-6 was 2,310 (9.8%) where 1,159 are males and 1,151 are females. Peravoor Panchayat had an overall literacy of 94% where male literacy stands at 96.4% and female literacy was 91.9%. Peravoor Panchayat consists of two revenue villages like Manathana and Vellarvelly.

Administration
Peravoor Grama Panchayat is part of Peravoor Block Panchayat and is divided into 16 
wards. P.P. Venugopalan is the current president of Peravoor Grama Panchayat.

Politics

Peravoor Assembly constituency is a part of Kannur Lok Sabha constituency. The current MLA of Peravoor is Adv. Sunny Joseph from INC who won in 2021 Kerala Legislative Assembly election with a vote share of 46.93%.

Law and order
Peravoor is one of the four sub divisions in Kannur rural police district. Peravoor sub division was established on 18th February 2021 by bifurcating Iritty sub division. The sub division has jurisdiction over four police stations, viz Peravoor, Muzhakkunnu, Maloor and Kelakam, with an area of 379 km², comprising 11 villages.

Transportation

The national highway passes through Kannur town. Mangalore and Mumbai can be accessed on the northern side and Cochin and Thiruvananthapuram can be accessed on the southern side. The road to the east of Iritty connects to Mysore and Bangalore. The nearest railway station is  Thalassery on Shoranur-Mangalore Section of southern railway. Kannur International Airport is just 27 km away from Peravoor. There are airports at Mangalore and Calicut.

Kerala Hill Highway (SH 59) passes through Peravoor town which connects eastern parts of Kannur district with Kozhikode and Wayanad districts . Wayanad is just 30 km away from Peravoor. Wayanad can be accessed through Peravoor-Nedumpoil-Mananthavadi road (Baveli Road) or Peravoor-Kottiyoor-Mananthavady road. There are several bypass roads available such as the Peravoor-Poolakutty-Mananthvady road which was used by Pazhassi Raja, British people and Tippu Sultan.

Distances to some of the important places:
 Bangalore / Bengaluru - 290 km
 Mysore - 150 km
 Coorg - 54 km
 Kochi - 293 km
 Wayand - 20 km
 Mangalore - 180 km

Educational Institutions
 Malabar B. Ed. Training College, Peravoor
  De-Paul Arts and Science College, Edathotty
 Government ITI, Peravoor 
 St. Joseph's HS, Peravoor
 Government HSS, Manathana

Hospitals 
 Resmi Hospital 
Archana Hospital

 Syrus Hospital
 Peravoor Taluk Hospital
 Dr.V Bhaskaran memorial Peravoor Nursing Home
 
 many Homeopathic, Ayurvedic and Dental hospitals and clinics

Tourism 
Peravoor and the surrounding areas have many tourist attractions.
 Aralam Wildlife Sanctuary
 Puralimala (Mayiladumpara)
 Pazhassi Dam and garden
 Kanjirakkolly waterfalls
 Perumparamba Mahatma Gandhi Park
 Coorg valleys
 Palchuram
 Krishnagiri river and Barapole hydroelectric project
 Central State farm at Aralam
 Steel Girder Bridge at Iritty built by British
 Madikeri
 Wayanad
 Wayand Ghat Roads
 Elappeedika

References

Cities and towns in Kannur district
Villages near Iritty